Heyl is a surname. Notable people with the surname include:

Allan Heyl, South African bank robber
Brett Heyl (born 1981), American slalom canoer
Charles W. Heyl (1857-1936), American politician
Jeremy S. Heyl, Canadian astronomer
Paul R. Heyl (1872–1961), American physicist
Willy Kaiser-Heyl (1876–1953), German film actor

See also
HEYL, a gene
Heil (disambiguation)